Kaine Kesler-Hayden (born 23 October 2002) is an English professional footballer who plays as a wing-back for Premier League club Aston Villa. He also captained Aston Villa youth team to victory in the FA Youth Cup.

Club career

Aston Villa
Having progressed through the club's academy system, Kesler-Hayden was named in the Aston Villa starting line-up for his senior debut on 8 January 2021 in an FA Cup third round tie against Liverpool, after "a large number of first-team players and staff" tested positive for COVID-19, rendering Villa's first-team squad unavailable for the match. Villa lost 4–1 but were praised for their performance.

On 24 May 2021, Kesler-Hayden captained the Aston Villa U18 side which won the FA Youth Cup, beating Liverpool U18 2–1 in the final. Kesler-Hayden was later one of several academy players given five-year professional contracts by the club in July 2021.

On 2 August 2021, Kesler-Hayden signed for Swindon Town on a season-long loan, and made his professional league debut five days later, in a 3–1 away victory over Scunthorpe United, in which he won a penalty that led to Swindon's equaliser. He received his first red card as a professional in his second appearance for Swindon, picking up a second yellow card in a 2–1 defeat to Carlisle United.

On 4 December 2021, Kesler-Hayden scored his first professional goal in a 2–1 FA Cup victory over Walsall. Kesler-Hayden featured in Swindon's third round FA Cup tie against Manchester City on 7 January 2022. Swindon were beaten 4–1, yet Kesler Hayden received widespread praise for his strong performance against the Premier League side. Two days later, on 9 January, Kesler-Hayden was recalled from his loan by Aston Villa. For his contribution on loan, Kesler-Hayden was later named Swindon Town's Young Player of the Season at the club's end of season awards ceremony.

On 31 January 2022, Kesler-Hayden joined League One promotion contenders Milton Keynes Dons on loan for the remainder of the 2021–22 season. He made his League One debut on 8 February 2022, in a 1–1 draw against Fleetwood Town. On 22 February 2022, Kesler-Hayden scored his first goal for MK Dons, also his first professional league goal, in a 2–0 away win over Charlton Athletic. He went on to make 17 appearances for the Dons, helping them to a third-placed play-off finish.

On 12 August 2022, Kesler-Hayden joined Championship club Huddersfield Town on a season-long loan. On 15 January 2023, Aston Villa recalled Kesler-Hayden from his loan. He had made 15 appearances with one goal and one assist during his loan. Hudderslield Head of Football Operations Leigh Bromby explained that the decision was made mutuallly between both teams with the player's best interests in mind, after Huddersfield made the signing of Matthew Lowton and Kesler-Hayden's place in the first-team was no longer guaranteed - the decision also allowing Huddersfield to use one of their loan allocations to strengthen another part of the team.

International career
Kesler-Hayden was called up to a training camp for the England U19 national team in November 2020. On 6 September 2021, he made his debut for the England U20s during a 6–1 victory over Romania U20s at St. George's Park.

Career statistics

Honours 
Aston Villa U18
FA Youth Cup: 2020–21

Individual
Swindon Town Young Player of the Season: 2021–22

References

External links

2002 births
Living people
English footballers
Association football defenders
Aston Villa F.C. players
Black British sportspeople
Swindon Town F.C. players
Milton Keynes Dons F.C. players
English Football League players
Huddersfield Town A.F.C. players